Matthias Wahls (born January 25, 1968) is a German chess grandmaster and poker player.

Wahls began his career in chess through the SK Union Eimsbuettel, a chess club in Hamburg. Beginning in 1985, he played for Hamburger SK in the first division, and the same year he became the German youth champion. In 1988 he was appointed by the FIDE as an International Master, and a year later to Grandmaster.

In the early 90s, Matthias experienced his greatest success in the chess world. He represented Germany in the 1990 and 1992 Chess Olympiads. He won the 1996 and 1997 German championships. In 1998, Wahls qualified for the FIDE World Chess Championship, which was held a year later in Las Vegas. There, he defeated Altin Cela of Albania in the first round by 1½ – ½ but fell in the second round by 0 – 2 to Ukrainian Vassily Ivanchuk.

In the second half of the 1990s, Wahls began conducting seminars on chess issues, especially openings and reduced his tournament activities. He also published a book in 1997 on the opening Scandinavian Defense, and in 2005 a multimedia course, The Best Opening Traps.

Since July 2006, Wahls' Elo rating has remained unchanged at 2543, as he has played no Elo-eligible matches.

Wahls has also focused on the game of poker. In 2007, he founded the world's largest poker school, PokerStrategy.com, with Dominik Kofert. The school has over 5.5 million members (as of 2013), and is based in Gibraltar. Wahls intended to spread the poker game Texas hold 'em in Germany. After working with the school for several years, it was reported in November 2011 that Wahl had relocated to southern Spain "for a financially successful excursion into the world of poker".

References

External links
 
 

Chess grandmasters
Living people
1968 births